Empire is an album led by jazz bassist Scott Colley which was recorded in 2009 and released by the CAM Jazz label.

Reception

The AllMusic review by Ken Dryden states "when Colley has had the opportunity to record as a leader, he has explored provocative originals interpreted with a crop of great players from his generation ... This often subtle release deserves a quiet setting to be truly appreciated, it is easily one of Scott Colley's finest recordings".

On All About Jazz, John Kelman's review called it "a sure contender for one of 2010's top picks" and said "Empire may have been a long time coming, but arrives with an even more definitive sense of purpose and, given the chameleon-like demands on Colley as a sideman, a clear, cohesive and cogent conceptual voice".

NPR's Kevin Whitehead noted "Colley's lyrical and catchy tunes bring Empire halfway home, but it's the players who complete the job; who breathe life into the frameworks he builds. This is heartland music born in Manhattan".

BBC Music's Lara Bellini said "Colley’s writing is superb ... Tagging along on his rhythmical discourse is an exciting, never predictable journey, and definitely never a soulless one. Colley is engaging, propelling the action forward with a relentless sense of swing, and Empire is excellent".

Track listing
All compositions by Scott Colley
 "January" – 4:53
 "The Gettin Place" – 8:24
 "For Sophia" – 5:20
 "5:30 AM" – 7:23
 "Speculation" – 6:46
 "Tomorrowland" – 3:23
 "Now What?" – 6:14
 "Gut" – 4:07
 "Five-Two" – 6:12
 "Five-Two.2" – 2:01

Personnel
Scott Colley − bass
Ralph Alessi – trumpet
Craig Taborn − piano
Bill Frisell – electric guitar
Brian Blade - drums

References

Scott Colley albums
2010 albums
CAM Jazz albums